The Philippines men's national sitting volleyball team represents the Philippines in international sitting volleyball competitions and friendly matches.

They were to compete at the 2020 ASEAN Para Games, which was supposed to he hosted by the Philippines. The games was cancelled due to the COVID-19 pandemic.

Honors

Paralympic Games

ASEAN Para Games

See also
 Philippines at the Paralympics
 Volleyball in the Philippines

References

Sitting volleyball
Sitting volleyball
National sitting volleyball teams